Le Hunt (sometimes rendered as LeHunt) is a ghost town in Montgomery County, Kansas, United States.  While most of the site has been reclaimed by nature, the ruins of the United Kansas Portland Cement Company plant can still be seen today in the woods along the eastern shore of Elk City Lake.

History
Le Hunt can trace its origins back to 1905, when the United Kansas Portland Cement Company purchased 1500 acres a few miles northwest of Independence, Kansas and built a large factory. To accommodate the factory's many workers, a company town was established by United Kansas Portland Cement Company. The town was named after Leigh Hunt, the president of the Hunt engineering company of Michigan that had worked to construct the plant. By 1906, the fledgling town was home to over 1000 individuals, and around this time, Tom Mix (who would go on to be a famous American film actor and the star of many early Western movies) served as the small town's marshal.

Following its establishment, the United Kansas Portland Cement Company suffered several years of financial issues, largely due to the failings of the Kansas cement industry. In 1913, the local newspaper announced that the plant would be temporarily closed to make repairs and sell its surplus stock. By January 1914, the company filed for bankruptcy. In 1915, the plant was purchased by the Sunflower Portland Cement Company. Price fluctuations after World War I caused the Sunflower Portland Cement Company to be purchased in 1918 by its rival, the Western States Portland Cement Company, which after a series of mergers and purchases, became a part of the United States Steel Corporation. These events led to the Le Hunt plant closing, its equipment being sold off, and many of the homes located in Le Hunt being moved elsewhere. With limited housing and no major company to anchor the settlement, Le Hunt faded until it was nothing more than a derelict ghost town.

Today, ruins of the cement plant still remain in the woods off County Road 5000. Most prominent is the factory's long-abandoned smoke stack, which rises above the tree line. According to Legends of America, "While trees and weeds try to choke out where the town's cement plant once stood, the walls, ovens and giant smokestack of the factory are still remarkably intact." Ruins of old houses as well as the settlement's cemetery are also present, but they have largely been reclaimed by nature.

References

Further reading

External links
 Montgomery County maps: Current, Historic, KDOT

Ghost towns in Kansas